Margaret Court and Marty Riessen were meant to play Ann Jones and Fred Stolle in the final to win the mixed doubles title at the 1969 Australian Open, but the final was never played. As such, the title was shared. 
This would be the last mixed doubles competition held in the Australian Open tournament until the 1987.

Seeds

  Margaret Court /  Marty Riessen (final)
  Ann Jones /  Fred Stolle (final)
  Rosie Casals /  Tony Roche (semifinals)
  Billie Jean King /  Roger Taylor (semifinals)

Draw

Finals

Full draw

External links
 1969 Australian Open – Doubles draws and results at the International Tennis Federation

Mixed Doubles
Australian Open (tennis) by year – Mixed doubles